Carrie Lynn Daniels (née Thompson; born November 25, 1972) is an American college basketball coach and the former women's head coach at Austin Peay State University (APSU).

Early life and education
A native of Scottsburg, Indiana, Carrie Lynn Thompson attended Austin Peay after earning All-American honors as a senior at Scottsburg High School. At APSU, she starred on its first team to qualify for the NCAA women's basketball tournament in 1996. That season, she was awarded APSU's Joy Award, which is presented annually to the university's top athlete. She was presented the 1995 Wilma Rudolph Award, given by the National Association of Academic Advisors for Athletics to "...honor student athletes who have overcome great personal, academic, and/or emotional odds to achieve academic success while participating in intercollegiate athletics..." after missing most of the 1995–96 with a heart ailment. She earned her bachelor's degree from Austin Peay in 1996 and a master's degree in education from the University of Nevada, Las Vegas (UNLV) in 1999. She is married to Billy Daniels, who played for the APSU men's basketball team during the time she was playing on the women's team. They have one son, Dalton.

Coaching career
Following her graduation from APSU, Daniels spent three years on the coaching staff of the women's basketball program at UNLV, serving as assistant coach to LaDonna Wilson-McClain, then as director of basketball operations to Regina Miller. She then was an assistant to three different head coaches during a seven-year stint at Western Kentucky University. On June 16, 2006, Daniels was named head coach of her alma mater. In her first six seasons, she led her teams to two OVC tournament titles and subsequent appearances in the NCAA tournament. With the first tournament title, she became the first APSU graduate to coach one of its teams into an NCAA tournament; with the second, she was the first APSU coach to qualify for an NCAA appearance twice. On March 9, 2015, APSU declined to renew Daniels' contract. Eight days later, Clarksville Academy hired Carrie Daniels as the new head girls' basketball coach.

Head coaching record

Austin Peay statistics 
Source

References

1972 births
Living people
American women's basketball coaches
Basketball players from Indiana
Austin Peay State University alumni
People from Scott County, Indiana
UNLV Lady Rebels basketball coaches
High school basketball coaches in Tennessee
Guards (basketball)
Austin Peay Governors women's basketball players
Austin Peay Governors women's basketball coaches